Zpověď Dona Juana is a 1991 Czechoslovak film. The film starred Josef Kemr.

References

1991 films
Czechoslovak comedy films
1990s Czech-language films
Czech comedy films